The montaña del Príncipe Pío is a hill in the western part of Madrid, Spain.

Background
It is named after prince Gisberto Pío de Saboya, a member of the Pio di Savoia family, whose wife Juana de Moura owned property there. Later, barracks (Cuartel de la Montaña) were constructed there. The Madrilene rebels who fought the Napoleonic invaders were executed there on the morning of 3 May 1808, as painted by Francisco de Goya.

Around the 1960s, the barracks were demolished to make room for the Parque del Oeste. The former location of the barracks is now the site of the Temple of Debod, a Nubian temple given by the Egyptian government to Spain in gratitude for Spanish help in saving antiquities during the building of the Aswan Dam.

References

Geography of Madrid
Hills of Spain
Landforms of the Community of Madrid
Moncloa-Aravaca